Wickapogue Road Historic District is a national historic district located at Southampton in Suffolk County, New York. The district has 17 contributing buildings located on six farmsteads. It is a rare surviving cohesive collection of historic farmsteads which illustrate Southampton's early agrarian settlement and subsequent agricultural development from 1684 to 1910.

It was added to the National Register of Historic Places in 1986.

See also
Beach Road Historic District
North Main Street Historic District
Southampton Village Historic District

References

Historic districts on the National Register of Historic Places in New York (state)
National Register of Historic Places in Southampton (town), New York
Historic districts in Suffolk County, New York
Southampton (village), New York